Price is an unincorporated community in Queen Anne's County, Maryland, United States. Price has a post office with ZIP code 21656.

References

Unincorporated communities in Queen Anne's County, Maryland
Unincorporated communities in Maryland